George Barton may refer to:
George Barton (cricketer) (1808–1864), English cricketer
George Elliott Barton (1827–1906), New Zealand politician and lawyer
George Burnett Barton (1836–1901), Australian and New Zealand lawyer and historian
George Hunt Barton (1852–1933), American geologist, Arctic explorer, and college professor
George Aaron Barton (1859–1942), Canadian clergyman 
George Barton (footballer) (born 1934), Australian rules footballer
George Barton (sport shooter) (born 1977), Australian sport shooter 
George Barton (rugby union, born 1997), Canadian rugby union player
George Barton (rugby union, born 2000), English rugby union player